Marie Fuema (born September 6, 1987) is a Senegalese-Congolese model. She lives in New York City, and is a model of IMG New York. Recently, she featured in the Oscar de la Renta 2009 pre-Fall fashion show.

References

External links
 

Senegalese models
People from Dakar
1987 births
Living people